Halat (also spelled Halate) is a municipality in the Byblos District of Keserwan-Jbeil Governorate, Lebanon. It is located along the Mediterranean coast, 32 kilometers north of Beirut. Its inhabitants are predominantly Maronite Catholics. Halat has an average elevation of 100 meters above sea level and a total land area of 957 hectares. The town has one public school, which had 112 students in 2008. There were 45 companies with more than five employees operating in Halat as of 2008. There is also a quarry in the town. Charles Bassil is the current municipality president.

Community

Churches 
These are some of the churches in the town of Halat.
 Mar Youssef (Saint Joseph) in Beit el Boumeh
 Mar Gerges (Saint George)

Geography

Neighborhoods 
These are some of the neighborhoods in Halat
 Beit el Boumeh
 Douweir
 Bahriyyeh (seaside)
 New Halat

Neighboring Towns 
These are the closest towns to Halat.
 Fidar to the north
 Byblos further to the north
 Nahr Ibrahim to the south
 Zelehmayya to the east

Climate 
Halat's climate is typical for the Lebanese coast. Winters are cold and rainy. The temperature drops to 10 C on the coldest days. In the winters, the temperature can rise to 20 C. The summers are hot and dry. It virtually never rains in the summer in Lebanon. The temperature in Halat can go up to 30 C in the summer. The weather is very pleasant and cool in the fall and spring with occasional rain.

References

Populated places in Byblos District
Maronite Christian communities in Lebanon
Christian cities in Lebanon